Talochlamys multistriata, the dwarf fan shell, is a species of bivalve scallop. It is a marine mollusc in the family Pectinidae.

Distribution
This species is found around the southern African coast, from Saldanha Bay to Delagoa Bay, in less than 20 m of water.

Description
This animal grows up to 35 mm in length. It is a small bivalve with a single ear-like protrusion at the hinge. Its shell is finely ridged longitudinally and variably coloured from yellow to purple.

Ecology
The dwarf fan shell lives under stones and among algae. If disturbed, it can swim by clapping its valves together.

References

External links 
 http://www.marinespecies.org/aphia.php?p=taxdetails&id=236714

Pectinidae
Bivalves described in 1795
Taxa named by Giuseppe Saverio Poli